The Women's super-G competition at the FIS Alpine World Ski Championships 2021 was scheduled to be held on 9 February but was postponed to 11 February 2021 due to fog.

Results
The race started at 10:45 CET (UTC+1) under clear skies.

References

Women's super-G